A vibrating-sample magnetometer (VSM) (also referred to as a Foner magnetometer) is a scientific instrument that measures magnetic properties based on Faraday’s Law of Induction. Simon Foner at MIT Lincoln Laboratory invented VSM in 1955 and reported it in 1959. Also it was mentioned by G.W. Van Oosterhout and by P.J Flanders in 1956. A sample is first placed in a constant magnetic field and if the sample is magnetic it will align its magnetization with the external field. The magnetic dipole moment of the sample creates a magnetic field that changes as a function of time as the sample is moved up and down. This is typically done through the use of a piezoelectric material. The alternating magnetic field induces an electric field in the pickup coils of the VSM. The current is proportional to the magnetization of the sample - the greater the induced current, the greater the magnetization. As a result, typically a hysteresis curve will be recorded and from there the magnetic properties of the sample can be deduced.

The idea of vibrating sample came from D. O. Smith's vibrating-coil magnetometer.

Typical VSM overview

Parts of a typical VSM setup 

 Actively cooled electromagnet/power supply
 Amplifier
 Control Chassis
 Meter
 Computer interface
 Sensor coils
 Vibration exciter with sample holder
 Hall probe (optional)

Sample Operating Procedure: 

 Mounting the sample in the sample holder
 Turning on the VSM system
 Run the computer software to initialize the system
 Calibrate the system 
 Optimize the system for M
 Calibrate the Lock-In Amplifier
 Take measurements and record data

Conditions for VSM to be effective 

 Magnetic field must be strong enough to fully saturate the samples (or else inaccurate measurements will be taken)
 Magnetic field must be uniform across the sample space (otherwise the addition of field gradients will induce force that alter the vibration once again leading to inaccurate results

Importance of pick-up coils 
These allow the VSM to maximize the induced signal, reduce the noise, give a wide saddle point, minimize the volume in between the sample and electromagnet to achieve a more uniform magnetic field at the sample space. The configuration of the coils can vary depending on the type of material being studied.

Relation to Physics 
However, N and A are often unnecessary if the VSM is properly calibrated. By varying the strength of the electromagnet through computer software, the external field is sweeped from high to low and back to high. Typically this is automated through a computer process and a cycle of data is printed out. The electromagnet is typically attached to a rotating base  so as to allow the measurements be taken as a function of angle. The external field is applied parallel to the sample length and the aforementioned cycle prints out a hysteresis loop. Then using known magnetization of the calibration material and wire volume the high field voltage signal can be converted into emu units - useful for analysis.

Advantages and Disadvantages 
The precision and accuracy of VSM's are quite high even among other magnetometers and can be on the order of ~  emu. VSM's further allow for a sample to be tested at varying angles with respect to its magnetization letting researchers minimize the effects of external influences. However, VSM's are not well suited for determining the magnetization loop due to the demagnetizing effects incurred by the sample. VSM's further suffer from temperature dependence and cannot be used on fragile samples that cannot undergo acceleration (from the vibration).

References

See also 
 Magnetometer
Alternating (Field) Gradient Magnetometer (AFGM or AGM)
SQUID Magnetometer

American inventions
Magnetic devices
Measuring instruments
Magnetometers